Jeffrey Dewsnup (born May 21, 2004) is an American former professional soccer player who played as a goalkeeper for Major League Soccer club Real Salt Lake.

Club career
Born in Herriman, Utah, Dewsnup began playing soccer for a club side in his hometown before joining La Roca FC, a premier club soccer side in the state. In 2018, Dewsnup joined the youth setup at Major League Soccer club Real Salt Lake. He spent the majority of his time in the academy playing with the under-16/17s. On July 11, 2020, Dewsnup was called-in to Real Monarchs, the reserve affiliate for Real Salt Lake, for their match against San Diego Loyal but did not come off the bench.

Real Salt Lake
On January 12, 2021, Dewsnup signed a professional homegrown player contract with Real Salt Lake, becoming the club's youngest signing in their history. He was also the club's 24th signing from their academy.

Dewsnup made his senior debut for Real Monarchs, the reserve affiliate for Real Salt Lake, on May 8, 2021 against San Antonio FC. He started and played the entire match as Real Monarchs drew 2–2.

Following the 2022 Major League Soccer season, Dewsnup chose to retire from professional soccer at age 18, in order to pursue music and focus on personal mental health.

International career
Dewsnup has been called-up to represent the United States at the under-15 and under-17 levels. He made his debut for the under-17 side on February 24, 2021 against Denmark, starting in a 6–1 defeat.

Career statistics

References

External links
 Profile at Real Salt Lake
 Profile at USL Championship

2004 births
Living people
People from Herriman, Utah
American soccer players
Association football goalkeepers
Homegrown Players (MLS)
Real Salt Lake players
Real Monarchs players
USL Championship players
Soccer players from Utah
United States men's youth international soccer players